"Let's Kill Tonight" is a song by the American rock band Panic! at the Disco, released on August 29, 2011, as the third and final single from their third studio album, Vices & Virtues (2011). The band released a tour video on August 23, 2011. The song was first revealed along with three other songs from the album on February 1, 2011, when the band performed at the Bowery Ballroom in Manhattan. The studio version made its debut in the band's short film The Overture, released 9 days before the album.

Brendon Urie has said of the song that it is about having fun. In an interview with Hollywire TV, he said, "The lyrics kind of talk about just the idea of, you know, when you’re like feeling cocky and you’re out with your friends, and you’re like "Yeah! We’re gonna kill it tonight, this is gonna be awesome”, and that's really what it was about, just, you know, one of those good times, the party times."

Music video
The music video was uploaded to their official YouTube channel on August 23, 2011. It shows clips of the band performing live in black and white, along with some clips on the road. The video was not intended to be an official video, but a second version remains unreleased. As of December 2022, the video has around 16,000,000 views on YouTube.

Reception 
Matt James of PopMatters said it "is more indicative of Vice & Virtues' strengths." Josh Hall of Drowned in Sound thought the track was "simultaneously encouraging and disconcerting," but "nowhere near as gripping as any of those [songs] taken from A Fever You Can't Sweat Out." The song was listed as a track pick on AllMusic's review of the album.

Track listing

References

2011 singles
Panic! at the Disco songs
2011 songs
Song recordings produced by Butch Walker
Song recordings produced by John Feldmann
Songs written by Brendon Urie
Songs written by Spencer Smith (musician)
Fueled by Ramen singles